Harry and the Potters are an American wizard rock band formed in Norwood, Massachusetts in 2002 by brothers Joe and Paul DeGeorge. They have released three studio albums, three singles, three extended plays, four other albums, five miscellaneous releases and two side projects. All material has been released by the independent record label Eskimo Laboratories which the duo founded.

Their eponymous debut studio album Harry and the Potters was released in 2003. They released their second studio album, Voldemort Can't Stop the Rock! in 2004. The band released their third studio album, Power of Love in 2006.

They released two EPs, "Scarred for Life" and an untitled split with the Zambonis, on vinyl in 2006. The following year, the released their third extended play, The Enchanted Ceiling. The band released their fourth extended play, In the Cupboard, in 2008 and released their fifth extended play, Live at the Yule Ball, in late 2009. They released a sixth EP, Hedwig Lives, in 2015.

In 2008, the band were unsure as to whether they would work on a new studio album. In April 2010, Paul DeGeorge revealed that Harry and the Potters is contemplating making a fourth studio album. He explained, "But maybe there's something like that [a Deathly Hallows-related full length] in the future. It's hard to say right now."

Studio albums

Harry and the Potters

Harry and the Potters is the eponymous debut studio album by indie rock band Harry and the Potters, released on 21 June 2003. The album was inspired by the first four novels in the Harry Potter book series. It has been released on CD and digital download. In April 2003, the brothers wrote an entire album's worth of songs. The brothers split songwriting responsibilities between the two of them: Joe was responsible for songs dealing with Harry Potter and the Prisoner of Azkaban, whereas Paul was responsible for songs dealing with Harry Potter and the Chamber of Secrets. Harry and the Potters was recorded  at the DeGeorge Family Living Room in Massachusetts. According to Melissa Anelli, Paul wrote the majority of the instrumental tracks on his Casio keyboard, whereas Joe conceptualized most of the vocal tracks. Vocalist Paul DeGeorge later said, "We were pretty much writing songs and then recording them on the spot". This statement emphasizes the band's do-it-yourself amateurishness as an essential aspect of the album. In recording Harry and the Potters, the band aimed to release the album shortly before the fifth book in the Harry Potter series, Harry Potter and the Order of the Phoenix was released. According to Paul, "We were in a rush to get that stuff done before the 5th book release" and this instinct supports claims it took only two weekends to record the album. Despite the band's purported rush to finish the album, Paul and Joe worked particularly hard on the song "These Days are Dark." Paul DeGeorge used $1,200 of his own money to finance the pressing of the CDs.

Voldemort Can't Stop the Rock!

Voldemort Can't Stop the Rock! is the second studio album by indie rock band Harry and the Potters, released on July 1, 2004. The album was primarily inspired by the fifth novel in the Harry Potter book series.

Harry and the Potters and the Power of Love

Harry and the Potters and the Power of Love, or Power of Love, is the third studio album by indie rock band Harry and the Potters, released on July 4, 2006. The album was primarily inspired by the sixth novel in the Harry Potter book series. The engineer is Kevin Micka.

Lumos

Lumos is the name of the fourth studio album by indie rock band Harry and the Potters. The band announced the album at a live show on March 30, 2018, at which they debuted songs about The Deathly Hallows. The band later announced that the album would also feature the anti-folk musician Kimya Dawson as a guest vocalist. Parts of this album were recorded in a studio, and others were recorded at the Lawrence, Kansas public library. On April 23, 2019, the band unveiled a Kickstarter to help recoup the cost of recording the album, which they revealed was named Lumos. Backers could also choose rewards that include an additional album entitled Mostly Camping, as well as a vinyl single called the "Harry Potter Boogie."

Extended plays

Scarred for Life

Scarred for Life is the first EP released in 2006. It was limited to 1000 copies but physical copies are now out of print. All songs were later released on Priori Incantatem.

Split with The Zambonis

A split EP by Harry and the Potters and The Zambonis was released in 2006. It was limited to 600 copies and limited physical copies still available for purchase. Harry and the Potters songs were later released on Priori Incantatem.

The Enchanted Ceiling

The Enchanted Ceiling is the third extended play from wizard rock and indie rock band, Harry and the Potters. It was released in July 2007. The album was primarily inspired by the first two novels in the Harry Potter book series. It was released in a limited run of 1000CDs as the Wizard Rock EP of the Month for July 2007. It was later released for digital download. After three albums, Paul DeGeorge of Harry and the Potters decided to start a subscription-based Wizard Rock EP of the Month club. During March 2007, the brothers decided to record write as many songs as possible and record them in one weekend. The brothers recorded the songs in their living room. The album was later released on July 2007 through the Wizard Rock EP of the Month Club.

Some of the songs on the EP were actually written before March 2007: "Harry Potter" was written on the band's very first tour and a demo of "Rocking at Hogwarts" was featured on the band's Mail Songs #1. The demo of the latter contains the first recorded mention of the term "wizard rock."

In the Cupboard

In the Cupboard is the fourth extended play from wizard rock and indie rock band, Harry and the Potters. It was released in July 2008. It was released in a limited run of 1250CDs for the Wizard Rock EP of the Month in July 2008. After three albums, and several EPs, including one from the Wizard Rock EP of the Month club, Harry and the Potters decided to record another EP for the EP of the Month Club. On May 14–16, the brothers wrote an EPs worth of songs. The brothers recorded the extended play in their parents' basement, capturing the songs on a Portastudio TASCAM 424. According to Paul DeGeorge, the album is mainly "about weird inconsistencies and silly nitpicking [in the Harry Potter novels]."

Fourteen songs were recorded, but only ten songs were included. The songs "My New School," "Unicorn Blood," "Touch the Brains," and "Maybe Kreacher Will Bring Me a Sandwich" were later released on the compilation album Priori Incantatem. Paul DeGeorge later stated that the songs didn't feel right for the EP.

Harry and the Potters at the Yule Ball

Harry and the Potters at the Yule Ball is the fifth extended play from wizard rock and indie rock band, Harry and the Potters. It was released in December 2009 as a CD/DVD combo in a limited run of 1000 copies. The album was recorded live at the Fourth Annual Yule Ball. It was selected as the Wizard Rock EP of the Month for December 2009.

Hedwig Lives

 
Hedwig Lives is the sixth EP, released by the band in 2015.

 "The Great Motorcycle Explosion of ’97"  3:34
 "Ridin' in the Night"  0:54

Other albums

Priori Incantatem

Priori Incantatem is the first compilation album from wizard rock and indie rock band, Harry and the Potters. It is a double album. It was released in May 2009. The album is a collection of the band's previously unreleased songs, compilations appearances, songs from their out-of-print EPs, remixes and demos. The first disc was released on the CD format and for digital download, whereas the second disc was released exclusively on the CD format.

The physical release was limited to 1000 copies; disc one was later released for digital download.  Previously unreleased songs "Diagon Alley" and "The Wrath of Hermione" were recorded during Harry and the Potters sessions.

Remixes

Remixes is the first remix album from wizard rock and indie rock band, Harry and the Potters. It was released on 18 November 2010. The band released it for ditial download via Bandcamp, using the sites ability to ask potential buyers to name their own price. It features various fan-submitted remixes.

{| class="collapsible collapsed" border="0" style="width:67%"
! style="width:14em; text-align:left" | Track listing
! | 
|-
| colspan="2" | 
 "Felix Felicis [Best Person Alive Mix]" - 0:36
Remix by Harry and the Potters & Lauren and Kate
 "Phoenix Tears [Burning Day Remix]" - 1:39
Remix by Harry and the Potters & Erwin Beekveld
 "Hermione Screws Up the Polyjuice Potion [Gato's Lesson Plan]" - 1:06
Remix by Harry and the Potters & Dawlish and the Archies
 "Felix Felicis [Dumbledore's DS Mix]" - 1:53
Remix by Harry and the Potters & Paradise Dan
 "New Wizard Anthem [Roonil Wazlib Beat Mix]" - 2:36
Remix by Harry and the Potters & Erwin Beekveld
 "Gryffindor Rocks [House Elf Mix]" - 3:01
Remix by Harry and the Potters & Dobby and the House Elves
 "Felix Felicis [Eighth Clockwise Stir Mix]" - 2:09
Remix by Harry and the Potters & Erwin Beekveld
 "Save Ginny Weasley" - 3:38
Remix/Cover by Dumbledore’s Chorus
|}

A Wizardly Christmas of Wizardry

A Wizardly Christmas of Wizardry is the second compilation album from wizard rock and indie rock band, Harry and the Potters. It is a Christmas album. The album is composed of new songs and older songs that have appeared on various Christmas compilations. It was released in December 2010. The band released the album exclusively as a digital download via Bandcamp and iTunes.

The album contains various Christmas songs, some brand new and others previously released. "Yule Ball 2005 Cassette" and "Yule Ball 2006 Cassette" are each complete collections of the three songs released at the 2005 and the 2006 Yule Balls. The first features appearances by wizard rock bands The House Elves and Draco and the Malfoys, and the second features appearances by The Hungarian Horntails and Draco and the Malfoys.

Bradley Mehlenbacher plays drums on tracks 1-5, 7 and 10, and Amanda Hurley plays drums on track 8. It was mastered by Dan Brennan, and recorded, produced and the artwork was designed by Harry and the Potters.

Live at the New York Public Library

Live at the New York Public Library is the first live album from wizard rock and indie rock band, Harry and the Potters. It was released in June 2011. Exclusively released as a long-playing vinyl record. Limited to 500 copies. It is also available as a digital download.

Miscellaneous releases

Mail Songs #1

Mail Songs #1 was released on 3½-inch floppy disk in October 2003. It was limited to 20-30 copies, all of which were sent to people who sent the band fanmail. Two songs, "Bertie Botts" and "Rocking at Hogwarts" were later released on Priori Incantatem. The version of "Diagon Alley" that appears of "Priori Incantatem" is a different version.

Sonorus Cassette series
The Sonorus Cassette series was released on cassette on 31 August 2009. It is a series of live takes recorded onto seven cassettes. It was limited to 7 copies and it is out of print.

Mail Songs #2
Mail Songs #2 was released on 3½-inch floppy disk on 22 April 2011. It was limited to 40 copies

Side projects

Lemon Beat... The Beat

Lemon Beat... The Beat is an extended play from the hip hop side project Dumbledore. It was released in a limited run of 1000 CDs as the Wizard Rock EP of the Month for December 2007.

Bob Dylan Sings the Songs of Harry and the Potters

Bob Dylan Sings the Songs of Harry and the Potters is an extended play, jokingly purported to be recordings of Harry and the Potters songs sung by Bob Dylan. It was released in a limited run of 1000 CDs as the Wizard Rock EP of the Month for July 2009.

Other appearances

References

 
 

Notes

Discographies of American artists
Rock music group discographies